The 2013 Kashiwa Reysol season was Kashiwa Reysol's 3rd season back in the J.League Division 1 since promotion in 2010, making it their 41st season in the top flight overall. They finished 10th in the league, won the J.League Cup and were knocked out of the Emperor's Cup and AFC Champions League at the fourth round Semifinals respectively.

Squad 
As of January 31, 2013 

 (captain)

Out on loan

Transfers

Winter

In

Out

Competitions

Super Cup

J.League

Results summary

Results by round

Results

League table

J.League Cup

Emperor's Cup

AFC Champions League

Group stage

Knockout stage

Squad statistics

Appearances and goals

|-
|colspan="14"|Players who appeared for Kashiwa Reysol that left during the season:
|}

Top scorers

Disciplinary record

References
2013 J.League Division 1 Fixture

Kashiwa Reysol
Kashiwa Reysol seasons